The Metropolitan Borough of Stockport is a metropolitan borough of Greater Manchester in North West England, south-east of central Manchester. As well as the towns of Stockport, Bredbury and Marple, it includes the outlying areas of Hazel Grove, Bramhall, Cheadle, Cheadle Hulme, Gatley, Reddish, Woodley and Romiley. In 2021, it had a population of 294,800. The borough is third-most populous of Greater Manchester.

History
The borough was created in 1974, under the Local Government Act 1972, from the former area of the County Borough of Stockport and from the administrative county of Cheshire the urban districts of Bredbury and Romiley, Cheadle and Gatley, Hazel Grove and Bramhall and Marple.

Stockport became a county borough in 1889 and was enlarged by gaining territory from Lancashire, including Reddish in 1906 and the Four Heatons in 1913. The Marple Urban District of Cheshire, formed in 1894, gained parts of Derbyshire in 1936 including Mellor and Ludworth from Chapel en le Frith Rural District.

Prior to its creation, it was suggested that the metropolitan borough be named "Norchester", but this was rejected as "a concocted name", being beaten by "Stockport" by a vote of 16 to 5.

Geography
Adswood
Bramhall, Bredbury, Brinnington
Cale Green, Cheadle, Cheadle Heath, Cheadle Hulme, Compstall
Davenport
Edgeley
Gatley
Heaton Chapel
Heaton Mersey
Heaton Moor
Heaton Norris
Hazel Grove, Heald Green, High Lane
Marple, Mellor
Offerton
Portwood
Reddish, Romiley
Woodford, Woodley, Woodsmoor

Governance

Parliamentary constituencies
There are four parliamentary constituencies in the Stockport Metropolitan Borough: Stockport, Cheadle, Hazel Grove, and Denton and Reddish.  Stockport has been represented by Navendu Mishra (Labour) since 2019.  Mary Robinson (Conservative) has been MP for Cheadle since 2015. William Wragg (Conservative) has been MP for Hazel Grove since 2015.  The constituency of Denton and Reddish bridges Stockport and Tameside; the current member is Andrew Gwynne (Labour).

Unparished Areas
Showing former status (prior to 1974), the entire district is unparished (note that Offerton Park, called "Offerton Estate" until 2006, existed from 2002 to 2011):

 Bredbury and Romiley (Urban District)
 Cheadle and Gatley (Urban District)
 Hazel Grove and Bramhall (Urban District)
 Marple (Urban District)
 Stockport (County Borough)

Council

There are 21 electoral wards in Stockport, each with 3 councillors, giving a total of 63 councillors.

From 2002 until 2014, the Liberal Democrats had a controlling majority on the council.

Following the 2014 Local Elections, no party had overall control. The Liberal Democrats remained the largest party, despite losing a seat, but decided not to form a minority administration and strongly refused any possibility of a coalition with the Conservatives.

Following the 2016 Local Elections, no party had overall control with the Liberal Democrat council leader Sue Derbyshire losing her seat and Labour taking over as largest party.

Following the 2022 Local Elections, the Liberal Democrats took control of the council and Mark Hunter became leader.

Demography

At the 2001 UK census, the Metropolitan Borough of Stockport had a total population of 284,528.
Of the 120,456 households in Stockport: 38.0% were married couples living together, 30.3% were one-person households, 8.3% were co-habiting couples and 9.4% were lone parents.

Of those aged 16–74 in Stockport, 25.7% had no academic qualifications, lower than 28.9% in all of England. 5.0% of Stockport's residents were born outside the United Kingdom, significantly lower than the national average of 9.2%. The largest minority group was recorded as Asian, at 2.1% of the population.

Population change
The table below details the population change since 1801, including the percentage change since the last available census data. Although the Metropolitan Borough of Stockport has only existed 1974, figures have been generated by combining data from the towns, villages and civil parishes that would later be constituent parts of the borough.

Ethnicity

Religion

The following table shows the religious identity of residents residing in Stockport.

Economy

The Co-operative Bank opened a telephone banking centre in the Stockport pyramid in 1994. In 1999, the Stockport pyramid became the administrative home of smile.co.uk, an internet bank owned by the Co-op. The Co-op moved out of the pyramid building in 2019 and it is now available to let. Experian ranked Stockport fifth in North West England for shopping. The Merseyway Shopping Centre underwent a £15m redevelopment. Other shopping centres in Stockport include the Grand Central Stockport and the Stockport Peel Centre.

Medical equipment and technology, financial and professional services, computer and internet based services, and creative industries have been identified as growth industries in Greater Manchester, all with concentrations in Stockport. With employment at 2.0%, Stockport has the lowest rate of unemployment of all Greater Manchester's boroughs. Average house prices in the Stockport are second out of all the metropolitan boroughs in Greater Manchester, 27.7% higher than the average for the county.

At the 2001 UK census, Stockport had 204,812 residents aged 16 to 74. 2.4% of these people were students with jobs, 3.3% students without jobs, 5.4% looking after home or family, 5.0% permanently sick or disabled and 2.4% economically inactive for other reasons. These figures were generally in line with the national averages, although the proportion of people looking after home and family and students without jobs was significantly lower than the national average.

In 2001, of 136,059 residents of Stockport in employment, the industry of employment was: 17.3% retail and wholesale, 14.7% manufacturing, 13.8% property and business services,  11.7% health and social work, 8.9% education, 7.7% transport and communications, 6.1% construction, 5.3% finance, 4.6% public administration and defence, 4.1% hotels and restaurants, 0.7% energy and water supply, 0.6% agriculture and 4.3% other. This was roughly in line with national figures, except for the proportion of jobs in agriculture which is less than half the national average, reflecting the town's suburban nature and its proximity to the centre of Manchester.

Landmarks

Stockport has 386 listed buildings.

There are six Scheduled Ancient Monuments in the borough. Two date to the Bronze Age, a cairn in Ludworth and the Brown Low bowl barrow. Two related to medieval halls, Peel Hall in Heaton Moor and Torkington Moat. The final two were both built at the start of the 19th century, Oldknows Limekilns and the Marple Aqueduct.

Stockport has 14 local nature reserves: Abney Hall Park, Carr Wood, Chadkirk Country Estate, Crookilley Woods, Etherow Country Park, Gatley Carrs, Heaton Mersey Common, Happy Valley, Mersey Vale Nature Park, Poise Brook, Reddish Vale Country Park, Tangshutts Fields, Woodbank Park and Wright's Wood.

Education

Overall, Stockport was ranked 21st out of all the Local Education Authorities in SATs performance in 2006 and was 2nd in Greater Manchester. Authorised and unauthorised absences from Stockport secondary schools in 2006-07 were 6.7% and 1.3% respectively, almost the same as the national average (6.8% and 1.3%). In 2007, the Stockport LEA was ranked 30th out of 148 in the country, and 2nd in Greater Manchester, based on the percentage of pupils attaining at least 5 A*-C grades at GCSE including Maths and English (50.0% compared with the national average of 45.8%).

In 2006, Cheadle Hulme School was the most successful school in Stockport at both GCSE and A-level; 99% of the pupils gaining five or more GCSEs at A*-C grade including Maths and English. At A-level, it was also the 72nd most successful school in the country.

Twin towns
The Borough of Stockport has formal twinning arrangements with two European places: Béziers was originally twinned with the County Borough of Stockport and became twinned with the Metropolitan Borough on its creation in 1974.

Béziers, France, 1972
Heilbronn, Germany, 1982

References

Bibliography

External links
Stockport Council

 
 
1974 establishments in England
Metropolitan boroughs of Greater Manchester